The Krylatskoye Rowing Canal is a canoe sprint and rowing venue located in the Krylatskoye Sports Complex in Moscow, Russia.

Constructed in 1973, the venue hosted the 1973 European Rowing Championships. It then hosted canoeing and rowing competitions for the 1980 Summer Olympics. It was the host venue for the 2014 ICF Canoe Sprint World Championships.

References

1980 Summer Olympics official report. Volume 2. Part 1. pp. 91–94.
ICF Bidding Questionnaire: 2014 ICF Canoe Sprint World Championships Moscow. - accessed 11 April 2010.

Venues of the 1980 Summer Olympics
Olympic canoeing venues
Olympic rowing venues
Sports venues completed in 1973
Sports venues built in the Soviet Union
Sports venues in Russia
1973 establishments in Russia